Anwar or Al Anwar may refer to:

 Anwar (name), a given name and surname (including a list of people and characters with the name)
Anwar (singer) (born 1949), Indian playback singer
Anwar (2007 film), a Hindi film
Anwar (2010 film), a Malayalam film
MV Anwar, a coaster originally named Empire Cape

Al Anwar
Al Anwar (Lebanese newspaper), an Arabic daily
Al Anwar, short for Kitab al-anwar wal-maraqib by Jacob Qirqisani c.728 CE
Al Anwar, Al-Hakim Mosque in Cairo
Al Anwar, Grand Anwar Mosque in Addis Ababa

See also
 Anwar al Farkadain (Eta Ursae Minoris),  a star
 Anwarul, a given name
 ANWR, a wildlife refuge in Alaska
 Anvar, a name